The Central Region is one of the sixteen administrative regions of Ghana. It is bordered by Ashanti and Eastern regions to the north, Western region to the west, Greater Accra region to the east, and to the south by the Gulf of Guinea. The Central Region is renowned for its many elite high schools and an economy based on an abundance of industrial minerals and tourism. The Central region boasts of many tourist attractions such as castles, forts and beaches dotted along the region's coastline.

Economy and tourism
The Central Region is a hub of education, with some of the best schools in the country. The region's economy is dominated by services followed by mining and fishing. Cape Coast Castle and Elmina Castle are prominent UNESCO World Heritage Sites and serve as a reminder of the Trans-Atlantic slave trade. The Central Region is a major center for tourism within Ghana and it has some of the most beautiful beaches and national parks (Kakum National Park). U.S. President Barack Obama made his first international trip to the city of Cape Coast in 2009.

Education

Public Universities 
 University of Cape Coast
 University of Education, Winneba
 Cape Coast Technical University

Private Universities 
 KAAF University College
 Marysons College, Cape Coast
 Pan African Christian University College
 Nduom School of Business and Technology

Training Colleges and Polytechnics 
 Ola Training College, Old Elmina Road, Cape Coast
 Presbyterian Women Training College
 Gladmond Vocational Institute, Abura/Asebu/Kwamank
 Methodist Voc Trg Centre, Abura/Asebu/Kwamank
 Archbishop Porter's Polytechnic, Cape Coast
 Fosu College of Education, Assin Fosu.
 Komenda College of Education, Komenda.
 Assinman Nursing and Midwifery Training College
Cape Coast Nursing and Midwifery Training College
Police Command and Staff Training College, Winneba
College of Community Nursing, Winneba

Senior High Schools 

 Aburaman Senior High School, Abura/Asebu/Kwamank
 Academy of Christ the King, Cape Coast                       
 Adankwaman Sec/Comm, Assin Darman
 Adisadel College
 Aggrey Memorial Senior High School, Cape Coast
 Apam Senior High School
 Assin Manso Senior High School, Assin Manso
 Assin North Sec/Tech, Assin Asempanaye
 Assin Nsuta Senior High School, Assin Nsuta
 Assin State College, Assin Bereku
 Awutu-Winton Senior High School, Awutu/Efutu/Senya
 Besease Sec/Comm, Ajumako Besease
 Boa-Amponsem Senior High School, DUNKWA-ON-OFFIN
 Breman Asikuma Senior High School, Asikuma/Od/Brakwa
 Charity Comm Sch, Twifo Hemang
 Charity International Senior High School, Gomoa Manso
 Diaso Senior High School, Upper Denkyira
 Dunkwa Sec/Tech, Dunkwa -On-Offin
 Edinaman Day Senior School, Edin/Kom/Eguafo
 Effutu Sec/Tech, Cape Coast
 Ekumfi T.I Ahmadiyya Senior High School, Ekumfi Ekroful
 Eguafo-Abrem Senior High School, Edin/Kom/Eguafo
 Enyan Denkyira Senior High, Abura/Asebu/Kwamank
 Eyan Denkyira Senior High School, Ajumako/Enyan/Esiam
 Ghana National College
 Gomoa Sec/Tech, Gomoa
 Holy Child High School, Ghana
 Insaanyya Senior High Business School, Kasoa
 Jukwa Senior High, Twifo Hemang
 Komenda Senior High School	Edin/Kom/Eguafo	
 kumfi T. I Ahmadiiyya Senior High, Abura/Asebu/Kwamank
 Kwanyako Senior High School, Agona Kwanyako
 Kwegyir Aggrey Senior High School
 Mando Day Senior High School, Ajumako/Enyan/Esiam
 Mankessim Sec/Tech, Mankessim
 Mfantsiman Girls' Secondary School
 Mfantsipim School
 MOSECO, Kasoa
 Nsaba Presby Senior High, Agona Nsaba
 Nyakrom Day Senior High, Agona Nyakrom
 Nyankumase Ahenkro Senior High, Fante Nyankomase
 Obama College, Mankessim
 Obiri Yeboah Senior High, Assin Fosu
 Obrakyere Sec/Tech	Awutu/Efutu/Senya	
 Odoben Senior High, Asikuma/Od/Brakwa
 Oguaa Sec/Tech, Cape Coast
 Pank Secondary Business College, Awutu Bawjiase
 Potsin T.I Ahm Senior High School, Gomoa Potsin
 S.D.A Senior High School, Gomoa Manso
 Saltpond Meth. Senior High, Saltpond
 Sammo Senior High School, Cape Coast
 Senya Senior High
 St. Augustine's College (Cape Coast)
 Swedru School of Business
 Swedru Senior high, Agona Swedru
 University Practice Senior High School 
 Wesley Girls' High School
 Winneba Senior High, Winneba

 Moree Senior High Technical School

Cuisine
The Central Region is well known for its varied choices in cuisine. Etsew and Fantefante (fresh fish palm oil stew) is the main dish enjoyed. Kenkey and Fufu are both eaten with a variety of sauces, stews, and soups.  Seafood is commonly eaten across the Central Region.

Administrative divisions
The political administration of the region is through the local government system. Under this administration system, the region is divided into 22 MMDA's (made up of 1 Metropolitan, 7 Municipal and 14 District Assemblies). Each District, Municipal or Metropolitan Assembly, is administered by a Chief Executive, representing the central government but deriving authority from an Assembly headed by a presiding member elected from among the members themselves. The current list is as follows:

Notable citizens

References

 
Regions of Ghana
Articles containing video clips